Cha Wa is a Grammy-nominated Mardi Gras Indian funk band based out of New Orleans, Louisiana. The name Cha Wa is a slang phrase used by Mardi Gras Indian tribes, meaning "we're comin' for ya" or "here we come." Frontman Honey Bannister is known for dressing in traditional Mardi Gras Indian clothing during performances, including intricately designed headdresses.

Cha Wa has released three albums, Funk n Feathers in 2016, Spyboy in 2018, and My People in 2021. In 2018, Spyboy received critical acclaim and was nominated for a Grammy Award in the Best Regional Roots Music Album category, and My People received a nomination in the same category in 2021. Cha Wa was nominated in several categories at the 2019 OffBeat Best of the Beat Awards, and in 2021, the band took home an awardfor Best Music Video at Offbeat's Best of the Beat Awards for Visible Means of Support (No Justice, No Peace Remix), filmed by Jonathan Isaac Jackson.

About
Cha Wa was formed in 2014 by bandleader and drummer, Joe Gelini. Gelini first heard of Mardi Gras Indians while he was attending the Berklee School of Music in Boston. During his time in Boston, he went to see a performance by Idris Muhammad, a New Orleans-born jazz drummer. Muhammed was performing in traditional Mardi Gras style, which piqued Gelini's interest. Muhammed later gave Gelini a lesson in Mardi Gras style which pushed Gelini to move to New Orleans after graduation.

Gelini quickly became involved with the Mardi Gras Indian community in New Orleans. He began attending practice rehearsals for Mardi Gras marches. It was at these practices that he met Monk Boudreaux, the grandfather and father (respectively) of J'wan and Joseph Boudreaux Jr., Cha Wa's future frontmen. Monk Boudreaux is also known as Big Chief of the Golden Eagles and one of the most widely known Mardi Gras Indian singers. Gelini's practices alongside Monk Boudreaux quickly turned into performances with him.

Gelini met Monk's grandson J'Wan Boudreaux while Boudreaux was still attending high school. Soon after, J'wan joined Cha Wa's lineup as the lead vocalist and frontman. Boudreaux is the Spyboy of his Mardi Gras Indian tribe, a respected position that entails warning the Chief of approaching rival tribes during parade processions. The band aptly named their second album Spyboy.

In 2019, Joseph Boudreaux Jr., Monk's son and Second Chief of the Golden Eagles tribe, replaced his nephew J'wan as the band's lead vocalist and frontman for a period of time, until 2022 when J'wan briefly rejoined the group. following the release of their album "My People," members Chief Joseph Boudreaux Jr., Aurelien Barnes, Joseph Maize, Ari Teitel, Andriu Yanovski, TJ Norris and Stephen J. Gladney left the band for undisclosed reasons and started their own band, The Rumble Ft. Joseph Boudreaux Jr. and immediately began a residency at the legendary Maple Leaf Bar leading up to Mardi Gras.

Releases

Funk 'n' Feathers
Cha Wa's first album Funk 'n' Feathers was released worldwide in April 2016 on the band's own UPT Music label. The 10 song record combines a mix of original tunes with several covers of New Orleans funk classics.

Spyboy
Cha Wa's Grammy-nominated album, Spyboy, is deeply influenced by New Orleans street culture. The band aimed to give traditional New Orleans music a modern twist. In Gelini's words, "We wanted to take the roots of what we love about New Orleans brass band music and Mardi Gras Indian music and then voice it in our own way".

Spyboy was produced by Galactic's Ben Ellman and features special guests Big Chief Monk Boudreaux (The Wild Magnolias, HBO's Treme) and Nigel Hall (Lettuce, Nth Power, and Danica Hart).

On the collaborative nature of the record, former frontman J'wan Boudreaux said "Everyone put their minds together to make this music. Everyone had input on at least one song".

The track "Chapters" was written by J'wan Boudreaux and explores the struggles he faced being raised in a single parent household. "J'Wans Story" gives Boudreaux a chance to explain how and why Mardi Gras Indian culture developed.

Gelini and Monk Boudreaux teamed up to write "Visible Means of Support". The song chronicles Monk Boudreaux's experience with "vagrancy" laws in the city that primarily affected African-American men.

Wildman
On September 26, 2019, the band released "Wildman" as a single, written by former guitarist/musical director Ari Teitel and former lead vocalist J'Wan Boudreaux. It was described as "an old-school, funk-driven tribute to the most hot-blooded Mardi Gras Indian Tribal member, who intimidates and 'opens up a hole' in the crowd of people for the Big Chief to emerge on Mardi Gras Morning. This song evokes the infectious energy of the Wildman which you can feel on the streets on Mardi Gras Day."

Visible Means of Support (No Justice, No Peace Remix)
On September 3, 2020, Cha Wa released a remixed version of their previously released "Visible Means of Support" "along with a video chronicling the ongoing struggle of the Black community and the rise of Black Lives Matter". The video won an Offbeat Magazine Best of the Beat Award for 2020's Music Video of the Year.

My People
The band's follow up album to their GRAMMY-nominated Spyboy is entitled My People and was released on April 2, 2021 on Single Lock Records. Andrew Block engineered and co-produced the record with Teitel. The band has garnered significant press surrounding the release, including an appearance on Good Morning America, Jazz FM (UK), and BBC 6. The album was again nominated for a GRAMMY in the Regional Roots Album category.

Touring and performances
In early 2019, Cha Wa performed at GlobalFest. In a review of the festival, Rolling Stone explained Cha Wa's performance as "a portable Mardi Gras dance party". That spring, the band played several shows at SXSW, including GlobalFest's official showcase at Palm Door on Sixth and the Brooklyn Bowl Family Reunion at the Historic Scoot Inn. A few weeks later, the group was featured at a celebration of 50 years of New Orleans music and culture by Relix Magazine at the New Orleans Jazz Museum. Summer 2019 saw Cha Wa play several large music festivals including the 29th annual High Sierra Music Festival, Montreal International Jazz Festival, and the Philadelphia Folk Festival among many others.

ESPN featured Cha Wa on their national broadcast on December 16, 2019 playing the ESPN MNF theme and one of Cha Wa's own songs. A few months later (September 13, 2020), Cha Wa's hometown team, the Saints, featured them on their official pregame show with a live performance of Cha Wa's original song "Saints Go Get 'Em". Lincoln featured a unique Cha Wa performance of an unreleased song at the Hotel Peter and Paul for their "Chart Your Course" Campaign with Cas Haley.

The band appeared for a performance and interview on Good Morning America the week of Mardi Gras 2021.

Awards and nominations

References

External links
 
 
 

Musical groups established in 2014
Musical groups from New Orleans
American funk musical groups
2014 establishments in Louisiana